Stefan Marinović may refer to:

 Stefan Marinović (printer), 16th century Serb printer
 Stefan Marinović (footballer), New Zealand football goalkeeper